La Valle is a village in Sauk County, Wisconsin, United States, along the Baraboo River. The population was 367 at the 2010 census. The village is located within the Town of La Valle.

History
A post office called La Valle has been in operation since 1856. La Valle is derived from the French meaning "the valley".

Geography
La Valle is located at  (43.583102, -90.131648).

Demographics

The economy of the village of La Valle is largely driven by tourism and the lake communities at nearby Lake Redstone and Dutch Hollow Lake.

2010 census
As of the census of 2010, there were 367 people, 165 households, and 97 families living in the village. The racial makeup of the village was 97.5% White, 0.3% African American, 1.6% Asian, and 0.5% from two or more races. Hispanic or Latino of any race were 2.2% of the population.

There were 165 households, of which 29.1% had children under the age of 18 living with them, 39.4% were married couples living together, 12.1% had a female householder with no husband present, 7.3% had a male householder with no wife present, and 41.2% were non-families. 31.5% of all households were made up of individuals, and 14.5% had someone living alone who was 65 years of age or older. The average household size was 2.22 and the average family size was 2.78.

The median age in the village was 39.1 years. 20.4% of residents were under the age of 18; 9.1% were between the ages of 18 and 24; 27.8% were from 25 to 44; 24% were from 45 to 64; and 18.8% were 65 years of age or older. The gender makeup of the village was 51.0% male and 49.0% female.

2000 census
As of the census of 2000, there were 326 people, 132 households, and 88 families living in the village. The population density was 778.8 people per square mile (299.7/km2). There were 139 housing units at an average density of 332.0 per square mile (127.8/km2). The racial makeup of the village was 97.55% White, 2.15% from other races, and 0.31% from two or more races. 2.15% of the population were Hispanic or Latino of any race.

There were 132 households, out of which 28.0% had children under the age of 18 living with them, 53.8% were married couples living together, 9.1% had a female householder with no husband present, and 32.6% were non-families. 24.2% of all households were made up of individuals, and 18.9% had someone living alone who was 65 years of age or older. The average household size was 2.47 and the average family size was 2.92.

In the village, the population was spread out, with 23.9% under the age of 18, 7.1% from 18 to 24, 31.9% from 25 to 44, 17.5% from 45 to 64, and 19.6% who were 65 years of age or older. The median age was 38 years. For every 100 females, there were 87.4 males. For every 100 females age 18 and over, there were 89.3 males.

The median income for a household in the village was $36,250, and the median income for a family was $42,000. Males had a median income of $31,953 versus $19,167 for females. The per capita income for the village was $16,823. None of the families and 3.1% of the population were living below the poverty line, including no under eighteens and 14.3% of those over 64.

Education 
La Valle is served by the School District of Reedsburg, which has 4 elementary schools, 1 intermediate school, 1 middle school, and 1 high school. Ironton-La Valle Elementary School is the only school in La Valle.

Notable people
Benjamin G. Paddock, Wisconsin state legislator and politician
Glenn M. Wise, Wisconsin Secretary of State from 1955 to 1957.

References

External links
 History of La Valle

Villages in Sauk County, Wisconsin
Villages in Wisconsin